Shyam Sundar is an Indian academic and professor at Banaras Hindu University. He works on Infectious Diseases - Leishmaniasis & HIV/AIDS.

Publications 

 Visceral leishmaniasis: what are the needs for diagnosis, treatment and control?
 Failure of Pentavalent Antimony in Visceral Leishmaniasis in India: Report from the Center of the Indian Epidemic
 Rapid accurate field diagnosis of Indian visceral leishmaniasis
 Splenic accumulation of IL-10 mRNA in T cells distinct from CD4+CD25+ (Foxp3) regulatory T cells in human visceral leishmaniasis
 Trial of oral miltefosine for visceral leishmaniasis
Determinants of survival in adult HIV patients on antiretroviral therapy in Eastern Uttar Pradesh: A prospective study

References

External links 

Academic staff of Banaras Hindu University
Indian medical academics
Year of birth missing (living people)
Living people
Infectious disease physicians